Homework is the debut studio album by the French electronic music duo Daft Punk, released on 20 January 1997 by Virgin Records and Soma Quality Recordings. It was later released in the United States on 25 March 1997. As the duo's first project on a major label, they produced the album's tracks without plans to release them, but after initially considering releasing them as separate singles, they considered the material good enough for an album.

Homework success brought worldwide attention to French house music. The album charted in 14 countries, peaking at number 3 on the French Albums Chart, number 150 on the United States Billboard 200 and at number 8 on the UK Albums Chart. "Da Funk" and "Around the World" became U.S. Billboard Hot Dance/Club Play number-one singles, the latter of which reached number 61 on the Billboard Hot 100. By February 2001, the album had sold more than two million copies worldwide and received several gold and platinum certifications. The album is widely hailed as a classic of the French house genre and a significant influence on subsequent dance music.

Background and recording
In 1993, Thomas Bangalter and Guy-Manuel de Homem-Christo presented a demo of their electronic music to DJ Stuart Macmillan at a rave at EuroDisney. The contents of the cassette including the song "Alive" were released on the single "The New Wave" on 11 April 1994, by Soma Quality Recordings, a Scottish techno and house label co-founded in 1991 by MacMillan's band Slam. In 1995 they released "Da Funk" alongside "Rollin' & Scratchin'" under the Soma label.

The increasing popularity of Daft Punk's singles led to a bidding war among record labels, resulting in the duo's signing to Virgin Records in 1996. Their departure was noted by Richard Brown of Soma, who affirmed that "we were obviously sad to lose them to Virgin but they had the chance to go big, which they wanted, and it's not very often that a band has that chance after two singles. We're happy for them." Virgin re-released "Da Funk" with the B-side "Musique" in 1996, a year before releasing Homework. Bangalter later stated that the B-side "was never intended to be on the album, and in fact, 'Da Funk' as a single has sold more units than Homework, so more people own it anyways  than they would if it had been on the album. It is basically used to make the single a double-feature." The album was mixed and recorded in Daft Punk's studio, Daft House in Paris. It was mastered by Nilesh Patel at the London studio The Exchange.

Bangalter stated that "to be free, we had to be in control. To be in control, we had to finance what we were doing ourselves. The main idea was to be free." Daft Punk discussed their method with Spike Jonze, director of the "Da Funk" music video. He noted that "they were doing everything based on how they wanted to do it. As opposed to, 'oh we got signed to this record company, we gotta use their plan.' They wanted to make sure they never had to do anything that would make them feel bummed on making music." Although Virgin Records holds exclusive distribution rights over Daft Punk's material, the duo still owns their master recordings through their Daft Trax label.

Music

Theme
Daft Punk produced the tracks included in Homework without a plan to release an album. Bangalter stated, "It was supposed to be just a load of singles. But we did so many tracks over a period of five months that we realized that we had a good album." The duo set the order of the tracks to cover the four sides of a two-disc vinyl LP. Homem-Christo remarked, "There was no intended theme because all the tracks were recorded before we arranged the sequence of the album. The idea was to make the songs better by arranging them the way we did; to make it more even as an album." The name Homework, Bangalter explained, relates to "the fact that we made the record at home, very cheaply, very quickly, and spontaneously, trying to do cool stuff".

Composition

"Daftendirekt" is an excerpt of a live performance recorded in Ghent, Belgium; it served as the introduction to Daft Punk's live shows and was used to begin the album. The performance took place at the first I Love Techno, an event co-produced by Fuse and On the Rox on 10 November 1995. Homeworks following track, "WDPK 83.7 FM", is a tribute to FM radio in the United States. The next song, "Revolution 909" is a reflection on the French government's stance on dance music.Warner, Jennifer. "Interview with Daft Punk"  . p. 2. DMA. About.com. Retrieved 10 February 2012.

"Revolution 909" is followed by "Da Funk", which carries elements of funk and acid music. According to Andrew Asch of the Boca Raton News, the song's composition "relies on a bouncy funk guitar to communicate its message of dumb fun". Bangalter expressed that "Da Funk"'s theme involved the introduction of a simple, unusual element that becomes acceptable and moving over time. Sal Cinquemani of Slant Magazine complimented the song as "unrelenting", and Bob Gajarsky of Westnet called it "a beautiful meeting of Chic (circa 'Good Times', sans vocals) and the 90s form of electronica". "Phoenix" combines elements of gospel music and house music. The duo considered "Fresh" to be breezy and light with a comical structure. Ian Mathers of Stylus Magazine criticized the song, stating that it "doesn't feel like the beach just because of the lapping waves heard in the background".

The single "Around the World" carries influences of Gershon Kingsley's hit "Popcorn". Chris Power of BBC Music named it "one of the decade's catchiest singles". He stated that it was "a perfect example of Daft Punk's sound at its most accessible: a post-disco boogie bassline, a minimalist sprinkling of synthetic keyboard melody and a single, naggingly insistent hook". The track "Teachers" is a riff on the Parris Mitchell song "Ghetto Shout Out!!", released in 1995 on Dance Mania. The track is a tribute to several of Daft Punk's house music influences, including future collaborators Romanthony, DJ Sneak and Todd Edwards. The song "Oh Yeah" features DJ Deelat and DJ Crabbe. "Indo Silver Club" features a sample of "Hot Shot" by Karen Young. The final track, "Funk Ad", is a reversed clip of "Da Funk".

Promotion and release
Packaging
The artwork for the front cover and inner sleeve was conceived by Daft Punk, photographed by artist and film producer Nicolas Hidiroglou. He met the duo through a connection at Virgin Records, and recalled that it took a week to complete the artwork. Homem-Christo had previously designed the Daft Punk wordmark, which was the basis for the front image of the logo embroidered onto the back of a satin jacket. Variations of the logo would continue to be the front cover image for all of Daft Punk's studio albums until Random Access Memories in 2013.

To create the inner gatefold photo, various items representing track titles were arranged by Bangalter on a table at his home. He noted that many of the pieces reflect Daft Punk's influences, including: a DJ Funk audio cassette; a card with a logo of The Beach Boys; a Kiss tour poster; and a 1970s compilation record featuring Barry Manilow. Other mementos include a token from the Rex Club, the venue in Paris where Daft Punk first performed as DJs. The wall behind the table contains a photo of Homem-Christo singing as part of the duo's first band Darlin', as well as the Darlin' logo next to a portrait of Homem-Christo as a small child.

The black and white image of the duo in the liner notes was photographed by Phillppe Lévy. It was shot during an event in Wisconsin called Even Furthur in 1996, featuring Daft Punk's first live performance in the United States. Additional artwork and the album layout were done by Serge Nicholas.

Singles
Homework features singles that had significant impact in the French house and global dance music scenes. The first single from the album, "Alive", was included as a B-side on the single "The New Wave", which was released in April 1994. The album's second single was "Da Funk"; it was initially released in 1995 by Soma and was re-released by Virgin Records in January 1997. It became the duo's first number-one single on the Billboard Hot Dance/Club Play chart. The song reached number seven on British and French charts. The third single, "Around the World", was a critical and commercial success, becoming the second number-one single on the Billboard Hot Dance/Club Play chart, as well as reaching number 11 in Australia, number five in the United Kingdom and number 61 on the Billboard Hot 100. In October 2011, NME placed "Around the World" at number 21 on its list of "150 Best Tracks of the Past 15 Years". The album's fourth single was "Burnin'"; it was released in September 1997 and peaked at number 30 in the UK. The final single from Homework was "Revolution 909". It was released in February 1998 and reached number 47 in the UK and number 12 on the Billboard Hot Dance/Club Play chart. Prior to its inclusion on Homework, "Indo Silver Club" was released as a single on the Soma Quality Recordings label in two parts. The single lacked an artist credit in the packaging and was thought to have been created by the nonexistent producers Indo Silver Club.

In 1999, the duo released a video collection featuring music videos of tracks and singles from the album under the name of D.A.F.T.: A Story About Dogs, Androids, Firemen and Tomatoes. Although its title derives from the appearances of dogs ("Da Funk" and "Fresh"), androids ("Around the World"), firemen ("Burnin'"), and tomatoes ("Revolution 909") in the videos, a cohesive plot does not connect its episodes.

 Critical reception 

Homework success brought worldwide attention to French progressive house music, and drew attention to French house music. According to The Village Voice, the album revived house music and departed from the Euro dance formula. In the book 1001 Albums You Must Hear Before You Die, critic Alex Rayner stated that Homework tied the established club styles to the "burgeoning eclecticism" of big beat. He contended that it served as a proof that "there was more to dance music than pills and keyboard presets." Clash described Homework as an entry point of accessibility for a "burgeoning movement on the cusp of splitting the mainstream seam". In 2009, Brian Linder of IGN described Homework as the duo's third-best album. He catalogued as a "groundbreaking achievement" the way they used their unique skills to craft the house, techno, acid and punk music styles into the record. Hua Hsu of eMusic agreed, applauding Homework for how it captured a "feeling of discovery and exploration" as a result of "years of careful study of the finest house, techno, electro and hip-hop records". David Browne, writing in Entertainment Weekly, stated that the duo knew how to use "their playful, hip-hopping ambient techno" to craft the album. He named Homework the "ideal disco for androids". Sean Cooper of AllMusic called the album "an almost certain classic" and "essential".

Chris Power of BBC Music compared Homework "less-is-more" approach to compression's use as "a sonic tribute" to the FM radio stations that "fed Daft Punk's youthful obsessions". Sal Cinquemani of Slant Magazine wrote that "while a few tracks are more daft than deft," more recent groundbreakers like The Avalanches could never exist without "Da Funk". Ian Mathers of Stylus Magazine noted that "there's a core of unimpeachably classic work on Homework, hidden among the merely good, and when you've got such a classic debut hidden in the outlines of the epic slouch of their debut, it's hard not to get frustrated." Rolling Stone awarded the album three stars out of five, commenting that "the duo's essential, career-defining insight is that the problem with disco the first time around was not that it was stupid but that it was not stupid enough." Rolling Stone ranked Homework at the top on their list of "The 30 Greatest EDM Albums of All Time" while affirming that Daft Punk's debut "is pure synapse-tweaking brilliance". According to Scott Woods of The Village Voice, "Daft Punk [tore] the lid off the [creative] sewer" with the release of Homework. In a retrospective review for Pitchfork, Larry Fitzmaurice awarded it 9.2 out of 10. He stated that "Homework remains singular within Daft Punk’s catalog, the record also set the stage for the duo’s career to this very day—a massively successful and still-going ascent to pop iconography, built on the magic trick-esque ability to twist the shapes of dance music’s past to resemble something seemingly futuristic." By contrast, Robert Christgau of The Village Voice cited "Da Funk" as a "choice cut", indicating "a good song on an album that isn't worth your time or money". Darren Gawle from Drop-D Magazine also gave a negative review, stating that "Homework is the work of a couple of DJs who sound amateurish at best."

 Commercial performance 
Daft Punk wanted the majority of pressings to be on vinyl instead of Compact Disc, so only 50,000 albums were initially printed in CD format. After its release, overwhelming sales of Homework caused distributors to accelerate production to satisfy demand. The album was distributed in 35 countries worldwide, peaking at number 150 on the Billboard 200.  Homework first charted on the Australian Albums Chart on 27 April 1997; it remained there for eight weeks and peaked at number 37. In France, the album reached number three and stayed on the chart for 82 weeks. By October 1997, the album had sold 220,000 copies worldwide. In 1999, it reached Gold status in France for selling more than 100,000 copies. On 11 July 2001, the album was certified Gold by the Recording Industry Association of America (RIAA), indicating sales of 500,000 copies in the United States. Billboard reported that, according to Virgin Records, two million copies had been sold by February 2001. By September 2007, 605,000 copies had been sold in the U.S.

Track listing

 25th Anniversary Edition 

On 22 February 2022, one full year after the duo's breakup, Daft Punk updated their social media channels with cryptic posts leading fans to a newly created Twitch account. At 2:22pm UTC, a one-time only stream began of the duo's full Daftendirektour performance at the Mayan Theater. At the same time, Homework (25th Anniversary Edition) was released digitally featuring the original album and 15 remixes; nine of which were previously unavailable on digital platforms. The anniversary release includes remixes from DJ Sneak (tracks 5, 12), Masters at Work (tracks 4, 6, 9, 13), Todd Terry (tracks 3, 11), Motorbass, Slam, Ian Pooley, and more. These remixes were released separately as a digital remix album titled Homework (Remixes)'''''.

The remix album was released worldwide on vinyl and CD on 25 November 2022.

Charts

Weekly charts

Year-end charts

Certifications

References

Bibliography

External links
 

1997 debut albums
Albums produced by Guy-Manuel de Homem-Christo
Albums produced by Thomas Bangalter
Daft Punk albums
French house albums
Techno albums by French artists
Virgin Records albums